The following is a list of notable deaths in October 1992.

Entries for each day are listed alphabetically by surname. A typical entry lists information in the following sequence:
 Name, age, country of citizenship at birth, subsequent country of citizenship (if applicable), reason for notability, cause of death (if known), and reference.

October 1992

1
Gert Bastian, 69, German politician, murder-suicide.
Ilgar Ismailov, 33, Azerbaijani soldier, killed in battle.
Petra Kelly, 44, German politician, murder-suicide.
Ali Mammadov, 37,  Azerbaijani soldier and war hero, killed in action.
Max Tera, 61, Indonesian cinematographer.
Salvatore Valitutti, 85, Italian teacher and politician.

2
Sabiha Bengütaş, 88, Turkish sculptor.
Honnappa Bhagavathar, 77, Indian actor, musician and singer.
Vincent Hallinan, 95, American lawyer.
Luis Serra, 56, Uruguayan cyclist and Olympian.
Bogdan Suchodolski, 88, Polish philosopher and politician.

3
Aliyar Aliyev, 34, Azerbaijani officer and war hero, killed in action.
John Carisi, 70, American trumpeter and composer.
Ted Dailey, 83, American gridiron football player.
John William Davis, 76, American politician, member of the U.S. House of Representatives (1961–1975).
Fritz Dennerlein, 56, Italian swimmer, water polo player and Olympian, traffic collision.
Lili Heglund, 88, Danish film actress.
Peter Klein, 85, German opera singer.
Marek Petrusewicz, 58, Polish swimmer and Olympian.
Ernest H. Volwiler, 99, American chemist.
Ken Wilmshurst, 61, English long jumper, triple jumper and Olympian.

4
Zoltán Lajos Bay, 92, Hungarian physicist and engineer.
Mohammed Benaziza, 33, French bodybuilder.
Denny Hulme, 56, New Zealand racing driver, heart attack.
H. D. Thambiah, 65, Sri Lankan lawyer and judge.

5
Sadhan Basu, 70, Indian physical chemist and academic.
Cornelis Berkhouwer, 73, Dutch politician.
Gösta Carlsson, 86, Swedish Olympic cyclist (1928).
Eddie Kendricks, 52, American singer and songwriter, lung cancer.
Fred Otash, 70, American private investigator and Hollywood fixer.
Appa Sahib Pant, 80, Indian diplomat, writer and freedom fighter.

6
Denholm Elliott, 70, English actor (Raiders of the Lost Ark, A Room with a View, Trading Places), BAFTA winner (1984, 1985, 1986), AIDS.
Natalie Moorhead, 91, American film and stage actress.
Bill O'Reilly, 86, Australian cricket player.
Margit Symo, 79, Hungarian-German actress.

7
Aina Berg, 90, Swedish Olympic swimmer (1920, 1924).
Ed Blackwell, 62, American jazz drummer, kidney disease.
Allan Bloom, 62, American philosopher, AIDS-related complications.
Martin Eichler, 80, German number theorist.
Joseph Kitagawa, 77, Japanese-American scholar in religious studies.
Bill Robinson, 73, English football player.
Mikayil Useynov, 87, Azerbaijani architect.

8
Robert Berdella, 43, American serial killer and rapist, congenital heart defect.
Willy Brandt, 78, German politician, Chancellor (1969–1974), and Nobel Prize recipient (1971), colon cancer.
Ian Graham Gass, 66, English geologist.
Lindsley Parsons, 87, American film producer and screenwriter.

9
Doby Bartling, 79, American football player and coach.
Jędrzej Giertych, 89, Polish writer and politician.
Mike Guerra, 79, Cuban baseball player.
Harjinder Singh Jinda, 31, Indian Sikh separatist, execution by hanging.
Ben Maddow, 83, American screenwriter and documentarian.
Mary A. R. Marshall, 71, American politician, fall.
Per Olof Sundman, 70, Swedish writer.

10
Sha Menghai, 92, Chinese great master of calligraphy.
Woesha Cloud North, 74, Native American artist, teacher, and activist.
James Seay, 78, American actor (The Life and Legend of Wyatt Earp, Death Valley Days, What Ever Happened to Baby Jane?).
Zofia Wojciechowska-Grabska, 87, Polish painter.

11
Ignatius Ghattas, 71, American Melkite Greek Catholic Church bishop.
William Neufeld, 91, American track and field athlete and Olympian.
Froelich Rainey, 85, American anthropologist and academic.
Zakir Yusifov, 36, Azerbaijani soldier and war hero, killed in action.

12
David Dragunsky, 82, Soviet army officer and politician.
Ulysses Guimarães, 76, Brazilian politician, helicopter crash.
John Hancock, 51, American actor (The Bonfire of the Vanities, City Heat, 10), heart attack.
Eddy Kuijpers, 77, Dutch fencer and Olympian.
Jim Percy, 43, Australian socialist politician, cancer.

13
Tula Belle, 86, American child film actress.
Jacques Delepaut, 66, French football player.
James Marshall, 50, American author (George and Martha, The Stupids), AIDS.
Les Pawson, 87, American marathon runner.
Hughes Rudd, 71, American newscaster, aneurysm.
Kiwako Taichi, 48, Japanese film actress, traffic collision.

14
Qin Mu, 73, Chinese educator and writer.
Poul Erik Petersen, 65, Danish football player and Olympian.
Anna Maria van Geene, 64, Dutch Olympic gymnast (1948).
William Waddell, 71, Scottish footballer.

15
Gino Cavalieri, 97, Italian actor.
Oliver Franks, Baron Franks, 87, English philosopher and diplomat.
Talwinder Singh Parmar, 48, Indian militant and Canadian-Sikh terrorist, shot by police.
Jackie Sullivan, 74, American Major League Baseball player.

16
Shirley Booth, 94, American actress (Come Back, Little Sheba, The Year Without a Santa Claus, Hazel), Oscar winner (1953).
Charley Burley, 75, American boxer.
John Tracy Ellis, 87, Catholic Church historian.
Maurice Féaudierre, 90, French journalist and painter.
Anna Hill Johnstone, 79, American costume designer (The Godfather, Ragtime, Dog Day Afternoon).
Vijitha Mallika, 49, Sri Lankan actress, cancer.
Antanas Poška, 89, Lithuanian traveler and anthropologist.
William Edmond Robinson, 72, American politician.
Vladek Sheybal, 69, Polish actor (From Russia with Love) and singer, aortic aneurysm.

17
Edgar Chandler, 46, American gridiron football player.
Brian Eaton, 75, Australian Air Force commander.
Herman Johannes, 80, Indonesian politician and scientist.
Orestis Laskos, 84, Greek film director, screenwriter and actor.
John O'Connell, 88, American baseball player.
Karomatullo Qurbonov, 30, Tajik singer, murdered.
Prem Sahgal, 75, British Indian Army officer.
Rouben Ter-Arutunian, 72, American costume and scenic designer, lymphoma.
Tadeusz Żmudziński, 68, Polish pianist.

18
Yoram Ben-Porath, 55, Israeli academic and economist, traffic collision.
Merl Condit, 75, American gridiron football player.
Gerald Ellison, 82, English Anglican bishop.
Makoto Fukui, 52, Japanese freestyle swimmer and Olympian.
Albert Schwartz, 69, American zoologist.
Alija Šuljak, 91, Bosnian Croatian war criminal during World War II.

19
Atley Donald, 82, American baseball player.
Arturo Farías, 65, Chilean football player.
Aldo Giordani, 77, Italian cinematographer.
Willie Lamothe, 72, Canadian musician.
Maurice Le Roux, 69, French composer.
Magnus Pyke, 83, English nutritional scientist and television presenter.
Wulf Schmidt, 80, Danish-English double agent.
James J. Stoker, 87, American mathematician and engineer.
Alvin Stoller, 67, American jazz drummer.
Arthur Wint, 72, Jamaican Olympic sprinter (1948, 1952).

20
Mimì Aylmer, 96, Italian actress.
Orton Chirwa, 73, Malawian politician and political prisoner.
Stanley McMaster, 66, Northern Irish Unionist politician.
Koča Popović, 84, Yugoslav politician, vice president (1966–1967).
Jack Reddish, 65, American Olympic alpine skier (1948, 1952).
Werner Torkanowsky, 66, German conductor, cancer.
Sam Vanni, 84, Finnish painter.
Rudi Weissenstein, 82, Israeli photographer.

21
Ante Ciliga, 94, Croatian politician and writer.
Joe Dwyer, 89, American baseball player.
Jim Garrison, 70, American attorney, cancer.
François-Didier Gregh, 86, Monegasque politician and Minister of State.
Bob Todd, 70, English comedy actor.

22
Eric Ashby, Baron Ashby, 88, British botanist and educator.
Red Barber, 84, American sportscaster.
Carlo Bernari, 83, Italian author.
Giorgio de Stefani, 88, Italian tennis player.
Pavel Khristophorovich Dubinda, 78, Soviet Red Army war hero during World War II.
Newell A. George, 88, American politician.
Wilson Humphries, 64, Scottish football player and manager.
Wolf Kaiser, 75, German theatre and film actor, suicide.
Cleavon Little, 53, American actor (Blazing Saddles, Temperatures Rising, Purlie), Tony winner (1970), colon cancer.
André Vandeweyer, 83, Belgian football player and coach.

23
Banine, 86, Azerbaijani-French writer.
Dorothy Dunbar, 90, American actress and socialite.
Ernst Hartmann, 76, German medical doctor, author and publicist.
William Masselos, 72, American classical pianist.
Vernon Morgan, 88, English Olympic steeplechase athlete (1928).

24
David Archer, 61, Barbadian cricket player and umpire.
Laurie Colwin, 48, American writer, aortic aneurysm.
Mohammad Ibraheem Khwakhuzhi, 72, Afghan politician and writer.
Gustav Kneip, 87, German composer.
Jimmy Orlando, 76, Canadian ice hockey player.
Luis Rosales, 82, Spanish poet and essayist, cerebral hemorrhage.

25
Adelino da Palma Carlos, 87, Portuguese politician, prime minister (1974).
Arnold S. Eagle, 82-83, Hungarian-American photographer.
Giorgio Locchi, 69, Italian journalist and writer.
Karen Lykkehus, 88, Danish actress.
Roger Miller, 56, American musician, lung cancer.
Richard Pousette-Dart, 76, American abstract artist.
Peter Rice, 57, Irish structural engineer, brain cancer.
Ivan Svitlychny, 63, Ukrainian poet, literary critic, and Soviet dissident.

26
Jerome Andrews, 83-84, American-French dancer and choreographer.
Laurel Cronin, 53, American actress (A League of Their Own, Hook, Beethoven), cancer.
Melvin Dixon, 42, American author and poet, AIDS.
Paul Eisler, 85, Austrian inventor.
Ridgely Gaither, 89, United States Army lieutenant general.

27
Ivan Andreadis, 68, Czechoslovak table tennis player.
István Balogh, 80, Hungarian football player and manager.
David Bohm, 74, American-British theoretical physicist, heart attack.
Paul Jessup, 84, American discus thrower, shot putter and Olympian.
Roy Marshall, 62, Barbadian-English cricket player, cancer.
Nayyar Sultana, 55, Pakistani film actress, cancer.
Wilson Whitley, 37, American college football player, heart problems.

28
Hubert Benoit, 88, French psychotherapist.
Greg Duhaime, 39, Canadian track and field athlete and Olympian, AIDS-related complications.
Charles Pellat, 78, Algerian-French academic, historian, and translator.
Lin Shen, 84, Taiwanese politician.

29
George T. Clemens, 90, American cinematographer.
Manuel Antonio de Varona, 83, Cuban lawyer and politician.
Kenneth MacMillan, 62, British ballet dancer, heart attack.
Louis Marin, 61, French philosopher, historian, and art critic.

30
Dionizije Dvornić, 66, Croatian football player.
Ben Lessy, 90, American comedian and actor.
Joan Mitchell, 67, American artist, lung cancer.
Kuladeivam Rajagopal, 61, Indian actor.

31
Trevor Atkinson, 49, English football player.
Jean Hébey, 76, French-Algerian film actor.
Brian MacCabe, 78, English athlete.
Sammy Ward, 28-29, Northern Irish paramilitary, killed by the IRA.

References 

1992-10
 10